Gabe Ikard (born September 26, 1990) is a former American football center of the National Football League (NFL). He was signed by the Tennessee Titans as an undrafted free agent in 2014. He played college football at Oklahoma and spent parts of four seasons on the active rosters of the Buffalo Bills, Cleveland Browns and Detroit Lions. Ikard was a radio host of “The Franchise Players” on 107.7 The Franchise in Oklahoma City. He also co-hosts “Big 12 Today” on Big 12 Radio (SiriusXM channel 375).

High school career
Ikard attended Bishop McGuinness High School in Oklahoma City, Oklahoma. He had 29 receptions for 542 yards and nine touchdowns as a tight end in 2008, and also recorded 68 tackles and two interceptions, including six sacks and one defensive touchdown. He was named district 4A-1 Defensive Player of the Year, and earned The Oklahoman Little All-City Defensive Player of the Year.

Considered a three-star recruit by Rivals.com, he was rated as the 15th best tight end prospect in the nation. He committed to Oklahoma over offers from Oklahoma State, Notre Dame and Stanford.

College career
After redshirting in 2009, Ikard would become the starting left guard for Oklahoma in the final 12 games of the 2010 season, while appearing in all 14. In 2011, he started the first three games at left guard before sliding over to center for seven games due to an injury, then returning to left guard for the final three games of the season. He was named a third-team All-American by the Associated Press and first-team All-Big 12. In 2012, he played in 12 games, starting all 12 at center, while earning first-team All-Big 12 honours once again. In his final season in 2013, he started all 13 games while being named first-team All-Big 12 for the third consecutive season.

During his tenure, he was named an Academic All-American three times, and was named the Academic All-American of the Year in 2013.

Professional career

Tennessee Titans
Ikard signed with the Tennessee Titans as an undrafted free agent in 2014. He spent his entire rookie season on injured reserve following a knee injury in the preseason. He was released during final roster cuts in 2015.

Buffalo Bills
On September 6, 2015, Ikard was claimed off waivers by the Buffalo Bills. On December 5, 2015, the Buffalo Bills released Ikard.

Cleveland Browns
On December 7, 2015, the Cleveland Browns claimed Ikard off waivers from the Buffalo Bills after placing offensive guard Joel Bitonio on injured reserve. Ikard was waived on December 14, 2015 and was replaced by offensive lineman Kaleb Johnson.

Detroit Lions
On December 15, 2015, the Detroit Lions signed Ikard to the active roster after cutting right guard LaAdrian Waddle and placing tight end Brandon Pettigrew on injured reserve. On September 3, 2016, he was waived by the Lions.

Buffalo Bills (second stint)
On September 5, 2016, Ikard was signed to the Bills' practice squad. On September 15, 2016, Ikard was promoted to the Bills' active roster He was released on October 21, 2016.

Cleveland Browns (second stint)
Ikard was claimed off waivers by the Browns on October 24, 2016. On August 28, 2017, Ikard was released by the Browns.

Denver Broncos
On October 26, 2017, Ikard was signed to the Denver Broncos' practice squad. He was released on December 5, 2017.

New Orleans Saints
On December 20, 2017, Ikard was signed to the New Orleans Saints' practice squad. He signed a reserve/future contract with the Saints on January 16, 2018.

Radio career
In summer of 2017, before he was signed to the Denver Broncos, Gabe Ikard joined the "Franchise Players" radio show on local Oklahoma City radio station 107.7 The Franchise with fellow Sooner Kelly Gregg

References

External links
Oklahoma Sooners bio
Tennessee Titans bio
Detroit Lions bio
Buffalo Bills bio
Cleveland Browns bio

1990 births
Living people
All-American college football players
American football centers
Buffalo Bills players
Cleveland Browns players
Denver Broncos players
Detroit Lions players
New Orleans Saints players
Oklahoma Sooners football players
Players of American football from Oklahoma
Sportspeople from Oklahoma City
Tennessee Titans players